Malleus is a genus of hammer oysters (marine bivalve mollusks) in the family Malleidae. This genus includes 27 known species.

Characteristic of this genus is the unusual "hammer-shaped" outline of the valves. The shells are nearly equivalved, but the hinge line is extremely long and is at nearly a right angle to the rest of the valves, which grow ventrally. The viscera of the organism are arranged in an oval-shaped patch near the umbones of the valves.

Species 
 Malleus albus Lamarck, 1819
 Malleus anatinus (Gmelin, 1791)
 Malleus candeanus (d'Orbigny, 1853)
 Malleus daemoniacus Reeve, 1858
 Malleus legumen Reeve, 1858
 Malleus malleus (Linnaeus, 1758)
 Malleus meridianus Cotton, 1930
 Malleus regula (Forsskål in Niebuhr, 1775)

Gallery

References

Malleidae
Bivalve genera
Taxa named by Jean-Baptiste Lamarck